The 2017 Lower Saxony state election was held on 15 October 2017 to elect the 18th Landtag of Lower Saxony. The incumbent coalition government of the Social Democratic Party (SPD) and The Greens led by Minister-President Stephan Weil was defeated. Though the SPD became the largest party in the Landtag largely fueled by the personal popularity of Weil, their gains were offset by losses for the Greens, depriving the government of its majority. The SPD subsequently formed a grand coalition with the Christian Democratic Union (CDU), and Weil continued as Minister-President.

This was the last election, state or federal, in which the SPD gained seats or increased their share of the popular vote until the 2021 German federal election and 2021 Mecklenburg-Vorpommern state election which both took place on the same day in September 2021.

Background
Following the 2013 state election, a red-green coalition between the SPD and Greens was formed, holding a one-seat majority in the Landtag. After Green parliamentarian Elke Twesten controversially defected to the CDU on 4 August 2017, the coalition lost its majority, which prompted Minister-President Stephan Weil to schedule an early election for 15 October. The Landtag was officially dissolved on 21 August after 135 of 137 parliamentarians voted in favor, with 91 votes required for its dissolution.

Electoral system
The Landtag of Lower Saxony is elected using mixed-member proportional representation. Its minimum size is 135 seats. Of these, 87 are elected in single-member constituencies, and the remainder are determined by party lists. Voters have two votes: the "first vote" for candidates within each individual constituency, and the "second vote" for party lists. There is an electoral threshold of 5% of second vote to qualify for seats. Seats are allocated using the d'Hondt method, with additional overhang and leveling seats provided to ensure proportionality. The normal term of the Landtag is 5 years.

Parties
The table below lists parties represented in the 17th Landtag of Lower Saxony.

Opinion polling

Results

Government formation
Neither the incumbent red-green coalition between the SPD and Greens nor the black-yellow opposition of the CDU and FDP secured a majority of seats in the election. Because the FDP ruled out the possibility of a traffic light coalition (between the SPD, FDP, and Greens) and the Greens ruled out a Jamaica coalition (between the CDU, Greens, and FDP), the SPD and CDU subsequently agreed to start negotiations to form a grand coalition.

On 16 November, the SPD and CDU agreed to form a government.

See also

2013 Lower Saxony state election
2017 German federal election

References

External links 
Election information from the state returning officer in Lower Saxony 

2017 elections in Germany
2017
October 2017 events in Germany